Lake Winola is a census-designated place located in Overfield Township, Wyoming County in the state of Pennsylvania.  The community is located along Pennsylvania Route 307.  As of the 2010 census the population was 748 residents.

Demographics

Notable people
 Hillary Clinton — former First Lady of the United States, U.S. Secretary of State and U.S. Senator from New York. Her father Hugh E. Rodham was born and lived in nearby Scranton, and Hillary Clinton spent much of her childhood at Lake Winola with her brothers Hugh and Tony.
 Hugh Rodham — lawyer and former Democratic Party politician, brother of Hillary Clinton.
 Tony Rodham — consultant and businessman, brother of Hillary Clinton.

References

Census-designated places in Wyoming County, Pennsylvania
Census-designated places in Pennsylvania